Julian David Bonhote Wilson (21 June 1940 – 20 April 2014)  was BBC Television's horse racing correspondent from 1966 until his retirement in 1997. He was succeeded by Clare Balding. Between 1969 and 1992, he was one of the commentators for the Grand National and for a time he had editorial control over the BBC's midweek racing coverage. He was born in Sidmouth, Devon; his father was the Daily Mirror sportswriter Peter Wilson; his grandfather was the Times and Mirror sportswriter Frederic Wilson.

Outside his presenting career, he was a racehorse owner and racing manager. His winners as an owner included Tumbledownwind, a two-year-old winner at Goodwood, and Tykeyvor, a winner in the Bessborough Stakes at Royal Ascot in 1996, trained by Lady Herries. He was a racehorse manager to Clement Freud and Walter Mariti.

Wilson was a former pupil of Harrow School.

Feuds

Peter O'Sullevan
In his autobiography Some You Win, published in 1998, he revealed a rift with Peter O'Sullevan, his long-time colleague at the BBC. Wilson felt that he had been misled as to whether or not he would succeed O`Sullevan as chief BBC race commentator. He also said that he had a strained relationship with Balding.

Death and broadcasting
Wilson died of cancer on 20 April 2014. He was twice married: firstly to Carolyn Michael in 1970, then to Alison Ramsay in 1981. He had one son, Thomas, with his first wife.

Julian Wilson's final BBC Grandstand was shown on Saturday 20 December 1997 with racing from Ascot, the BBC also showed highlights and memories of his broadcasting career.

The final broadcast of his career would come a week later (27 December) as BBC 2 showed racing from Chepstow which included the Welsh Grand National.

Grand National commentaries - 24

1969 - 1992.

Wilson would cover the first 4 fences on both circuits during his debut Grand National commentary in 1969 - the first in colour. The following year only he and Peter O'Sullevan would provide commentary, Wilson remarkably covering them over the first 12 fences up to the anchor bridge crossing on both circuits. From 1971 three commentators were again used for the National and Wilson would be stationed out at Becher's Brook where he would remain until 1992.

References

External links

1940 births
2014 deaths
People educated at Harrow School
BBC newsreaders and journalists
British horse racing writers and broadcasters
BBC sports presenters and reporters
People from Sidmouth